Uygun is a Turkish surname. Notable people with the surname include:

Bülent Uygun (born 1971), Turkish footballer and manager
Gürkan Uygun (born 1974), Turkish actor
Korkut Uygun (born 1975), Turkish chemical engineer and medical researcher
Samin Uygun, Turkish footballer

Turkish-language surnames